OutTV (stylized as OUTtv) is a Netherlands-based television channel which can be viewed via cable television/digital television as a premium channel in the Netherlands, Belgium, Sweden, Israel and Spain.
OutTV was launched on 2 April 2008 by OUTtv Media B.V. and has been available on cable since 11 April 2008.

OutTV was founded as a collaboration with the  Canadian channel of the same name, whereby the brand and many of the programmes were licensed. Nowadays, most of the programs of the Canadian channel are no longer shown on the Dutch channel.

An HD-simulcast started through Ziggo in the Netherlands on 30 November 2017.

Programming
OutTV is a lifestyle- and entertainment – channel which offers a broad range of programs, such as drama, comedy, talk shows, documentaries and films, which are mostly targeted towards gay people. Advertisements are shown before and after programs, so as to not interrupt the program.

Series and films
OutTV differentiates itself with a varied programming of quality shows and qualitative art-house films. For example, the Golden Globes and Emmy Awarded series Six Feet Under, the successful Irish drama series RAW and the controversial Queer as Folk are shown. But also enough entertainment; the lifestyle channel offers renowned comedy shows such as Little Britain, Absolutely Fabulous and Golden Girls. OutTV also broadcasts their own productions, such as the current affairs programmes OutTV News and OutTV Reports;  and the travel show Travel Experience, hosted by Ian van der Putten. It has shown specials covering several gay pride celebrations and the Eurovision Song Contest.

Several well-known shows which are or were broadcast on OUTtv are:
 Six Feet Under
 The Golden Girls
 RAW
 RuPaul's Drag Race
 Torchwood
 Queer as Folk (US edition)
 Alan Carr: Chatty Man

International OUTtv productions 
OUTtv is mainly known for its own production: "Eurovision Calling". The show, hosted by Jens Geerts, includes reports of behind the scenes of the Eurovision Song Contest. The first season started in 2012 with Timo Descamps and was named Baku Calling "Baku Calling". The seasons that followed were presented by Jens Geerts. Every year the show's name adapts the name of the host city where the Eurovision Song Contest is held.

OUTtv was also able to bring a few small scoops during the Eurovision Song Contest. For example, in May 2014 the Belgian singer Axel Hirsoux came out publicly for the first time and winner Måns Zelmerlöw repeatedly apologized in 2015 for his homophobic statement in the past. In April 2016, the Dutch candidate Douwe Bob told OUTtv to be bisexual.

Availability

OUTmusic 
On March 1, 2010 OUTtv started its own internet radio station under the name OUTmusic. This channel mostly targets gay men and “like-minded” listeners and primarily brings new and well-known hits of the 1990s and 2000s. In the evening lounge music can be heard and in the weekend well-known Gay Classics. Next to the standard programme blocks, OUTmusic also offers room for pop divas, well-known dj’s of famous gay clubs, new artists and the Eurovision Song Contest.

References

LGBT-related television channels
Television channels in the Netherlands
Television channels and stations established in 2008